The 2002 CAF Champions League Final was a football match that took place on Friday, 13 December 2002 at 17:00 UTC (19:00 local time). The match was played at the Cairo Stadium, in Cairo, Egypt, to determine the winner of the 2002 CAF Champions League. The final was contested by Zamalek and Raja CA, making it an all-Arabic club final for the fifth time in the history of the competition . The game was won by Zamalek 1–0 by Abdelhamid's Goal, after a 0–0 draw in Casablanca.

Qualified teams
In the following table, finals until 1996 were in the African Cup of Champions Club era, since 1997 were in the CAF Champions League era.

Background
Zamalek went into the Champions League final as champions of Egypt for the 11th time, and had lost just one Champions League game, the quarter-final second leg away to ASEC Mimosas. Raja also came first in their league. In the Moroccan League games between the two sides in the Champions League Final, They draw 0–0 at Stade Mohamed V in Casablanca, while Zamalek won 1–0 at Cairo Stadium in the return game on 13 December 2002.

Venues

Mohamed V Stadium

Mohammed V Athletic Complex is situated in the heart of the city of Casablanca, Morocco, in the western part of the Maarif neighborhood. It was inaugurated March 6, 1955, and currently has a capacity of 67,000.

Often hosting the games of the Morocco national football team, the Mohammed V Stadium is equally known as the home of Wydad Casablanca and Raja CA. It is named after King Mohammed V of Morocco.

Mohammed V Stadium is located in the centre of Casablanca. The international airport of Casablanca is 25 kilometres from the stadium, and the Casa-Voyageurs rail station is 5 kilometres from the stadium. The stadium has a parking lot with a capacity of 1,000 cars.

It currently has a semi-artificial lawn of a high standard.

Cairo International Stadium

Cairo International Stadium is an Olympic-standard, multi-use stadium with an all-seated capacity of 75,000. The architect of the stadium is the German Werner March, who had built from 1934 to 1936 the Olympic Stadium in Berlin. Before becoming an all seater stadium, it had the ability to hold over 100,000 spectators, reaching a record of 120,000. It is the foremost Olympic-standard facility befitting the role of Cairo, Egypt as the center of events in the region. It is also the 69th largest stadium in the world. Located in Nasr City; a suburb north east of Cairo, it was completed in 1960, and was inaugurated by President Gamal Abd El Nasser on 23 July that year, the eighth anniversary of the Egyptian Revolution of 1952. Zamalek SC currently use the Petro Sport Stadium for most of their home games and Al Ahly use Al Salam Stadium for most of their home games.

Road to final

Zamalek
In the first knockout round, Zamalek were won against APR FC, against whom they won the Home leg 6–0 while Hossam Hassan, Mohamed Abdel Wahed, Hazem Emam, Gamal Hamza and Mohamed Sabry scored the six goals. The Royal Club then drawn the second leg 0–0 to ensure a 6–0 aggregate win and a place in the second Round, where they were again won against Nkana.

The second Round matches represented the first time these two clubs had met in Africa . Zamalek went to Kitwe and secured a very creditable 2–0 win, before qualify to the Group stage of the Champions League, by drawing 0–0.

Zamalek were drawn in Group F along with ASEC Mimosas, Espérance and Costa do Sol. Zamalek won their first group game before securing a 1–1 draw away against Espérance, Zamalek as group winners and with the most points out of all the group winners, 13.

The semi-final pitted Zamalek against Mazembe; the teams had not met ever in the group stage of the Champions League tournament, the first time Zamalek won it. The first leg at the Stade de la Kenya was a drab affair, with Zamalek spending most of the game defending, whilst Mazembe tried to pass the ball around them.  That was about as exciting as the first leg got for either team and it ended 1–1 thanks to a goal from Abdel Halim Ali. The second leg at Cairo Stadium was a game of higher tempo, which Zamalek won 2–0 and Hossam Hassan scored twice. This result increased Zamalek's consecutive home win record in the Champions League to 5 and ensured that Zamalek reached the final unbeaten except losing a match in the quarter-final second leg away against ASEC Mimosas .

Format
The final was decided over two legs, with aggregate goals used to determine the winner. If the sides were level on aggregate after the second leg, the away goals rule would have been applied, and if still level, the tie would have proceeded directly to a penalty shootout (no extra time is played).

Matches

First leg

Second leg

References

External links 
 http://www.angelfire.com/ak/EgyptianSports/ZamalekAfr2002.html
 http://www.footballdatabase.eu/football.competition.caf-champions-league.afrique.2001-2002.finale..en.html
 http://news.bbc.co.uk/sport2/hi/football/africa/caf_club_competitions/2573103.stm
 https://www.youtube.com/watch?v=cuKJSR5_U8o

Final
2002
1
CCL
CCL
2002–03 in Moroccan football
2002–03 in Egyptian football